Phuthiatsana is a community council located in the Berea District of Lesotho. Its population in 2006 was 25,660.

Villages
Within Phuthiatsana, there are 85 villages including: 
 
  Cana
  Ha Bose
  Ha Bulara
  Ha Chaba
  Ha Hlaonyane
  Ha Jane
  Ha Kholopane
  Ha Koone
  Ha Korotsoane
  Ha Kotita
  Ha Lebina
  Ha Lechesa
  Ha Lehana
  Ha Lenea
  Ha Lenea (Ha Mamathe)
  Ha Libenyane
  Ha Mahleke
  Ha Majara
  Ha Malesela
  Ha Mamathe
  Ha Matelile
  Ha Matseleli
  Ha Moepi
  Ha Mokhathi
  Ha Mokhehle
  Ha Mokhethi
  Ha Mokoma
  Ha Molala
  Ha Monnanyane
  Ha Morolong
  Ha Mosethe
  Ha Mosobela
  Ha Mosoeunyane
  Ha Motsoaole
  Ha Motsora
  Ha Mphetlane
  Ha Mphunyetsane
  Ha Ntebele
  Ha Ntsabane
  Ha Ntsang
  Ha Ntsenki
  Ha Patso
  Ha Phalatsane
  Ha Phiri
  Ha Phoofolo
  Ha Ramachine
  Ha Ramotete
  Ha Rankali
  Ha Rankhalile (Likocheng)
  Ha Rantung
  Ha Rapalo
  Ha Rapopo
  Ha Seele
  Ha Selone
  Ha Seoka
  Ha Sepiriti (Moterong)
  Ha Seutloali
  Ha Taeke (Liphakoeng)
  Ha Thaka-Mpholo
  Ha Thube
  Ha Tjobe
  Ha Tšekelo
  Ha Tšepo
  Ha Tšoeunyane
  Hlokoa-Le-Mafi
  Khafung
  Khalahali
  Kolone
  Koti-sephola
  Lipatolong
  Liphiring
  Mafikeng
  Mahlanyeng
  Majaheng
  Malieleng
  Mamathe
  Masoeling
  Mohlakeng
  Paballong
  Phuthing
  Sebala-Bala
  Sefateng
  Thota-Peli
  Tilimaneng and Tsila-Tsila

References

External links
 Google map of community villages

Populated places in Berea District